This was the second edition of the event.

Kristian Pless and Aisam-ul-Haq Qureshi decided not to defend the title.

Lukáš Dlouhý and David Miketa won defeating Karol Beck and Igor Zelenay 6–1, 4–6, 6–3 in the final.

Seeds

Draw

References
 Draws on ITF Site

Neridé Prague Indoor